Blade solidity is an important design parameter for the axial flow impeller and is defined as the ratio of blade chord length to spacing.
  
Blade Solidity = c/s
Where
 is the spacing
 is the mean radius 
 is blade number
 Chord length c is the length of the chord line 
In case of an axial flow impeller mean radius is defined in terms of hub (inner radius) and tip radius (outer radius) as :

Blade solidity affects various turbomachinery parameters. So to vary those parameters one needs to vary blade solidity but there are some limitations imposed by  Aspect ratio (wing) (span/chord), pitch. If an impeller has few blades i.e high pitch it will result in less lift force and in a similar manner for more blades i.e. very low pitch, there will be high drag force.

Blade solidity should not be confused with rotor solidity, which is the ratio of the total area of the rotor blades to the swept area of the rotor.

Flow over isolated airfoil
Blade solidity is an important parameter that inter relates turbomachine parameter to airfoil parameter. Lift and drag coefficient for an airfoil is inter related to blade solidity as shown:
 
 

where 
 is lift coefficient
  is the drag coefficient
  is the inlet flow angle on the airfoil
  is the outlet flow angle on the airfoil
  is the mean flow angle
  is inlet flow velocity i.e relative to airfoil 
  is mean flow velocity
 is the pressure loss
 

In an airfoil the mean line curvature is designed to change the flow direction, the vane thickness is for strength and the streamlined shape is to delay the onset of boundary layer separation, taking all the design factors of an airfoil resulting forces of lift and drag can be expressed in terms of lift and drag coefficient.

b is the wingspan
c is the chord length

Preliminary design procedure

Design of the impeller depends on specific speed, hub-tip ratio and solidity ratio. To illustrate the dependence, an expression for axial flow pump and fan is shown 

where 
 is ratio of hub to tip diameter 
 is the specific speed

Cordier diagram can be used to determine specific speed and impeller tip diameter . Accordingly solidity ratio and hub-tip ratio (range 0.3-0.7) can be adjusted. 

Solidity ratio generally falls in the range of 0.4-1.1

See also

Aerodynamics
Turbomachinery
Axial-flow pump
Mechanical fan
Compressors
Autorotation (helicopter)

References 

 
 
 
 
 

Turbomachinery